Ethiolimnia is a genus of flies in the family Sciomyzidae, the marsh flies or snail-killing flies.

Species
E. brincki Verbeke, 1961
E. geniculata Loew, 1862
E. lindneri Verbeke, 1962
E. platalea Verbeke, 1950
E. vanrosi Verbeke, 1962
E. vittipennis (Thomson, 1869)
E. zumpti Verbeke, 1956

References

Sciomyzidae
Sciomyzoidea genera